Henderson is a census-designated place (CDP) in Chatham County, Georgia, United States. The population was 2,178 at the 2020 census. It is part of the Savannah Metropolitan Statistical Area.

Geography
It occupies a triangular area bounded by Little Neck Road to the northeast, Georgia State Route 204 (the Abercorn Expressway) to the south, and Interstate 95 to the northwest.

The Henderson Golf Course dominates the community's south side, with housing developments set around and between the links. Commercial development is concentrated on Henderson's southwest corner, adjacent to I-95's exit 94.

Demographics

2020 census

As of the 2020 United States census, there were 2,178 people, 971 households, and 548 families residing in the CDP.

References

Census-designated places in Chatham County, Georgia
Census-designated places in Georgia (U.S. state)
Savannah metropolitan area